The Manor is a 1967 novel by Isaac Bashevis Singer.  The book takes place in Poland after the Polish insurrection of 1863, and examines "the backwardness of Polish life at that time … [and] the conflict of old Jewish life and modern thought," according to Kirkus Reviews.

References

1967 American novels
Novels by Isaac Bashevis Singer
Novels set in Poland
Novels set in the 19th century